After a year long hiatus in 2007, The Fairly OddParents returned for a sixth season to contain 20 episodes, which aired from February 18, 2008 to August 12, 2009. The season had one movie, Fairly OddBaby. This was the first season of the show to be co-produced by Billionfold Inc. (which was founded by creator Butch Hartman and also formerly produced his other show Danny Phantom), along with Frederator Studios and Nickelodeon Animation Studio.

Episodes

DVD releases

References

2008 American television seasons
The Fairly OddParents seasons